Roger Wayne Marshall (born August 9, 1960) is an American politician, physician, and former military officer serving as the junior United States senator from Kansas since 2021.

On September 7, 2019, he announced his bid for the United States Senate in the 2020 election; he sought the seat being vacated by Pat Roberts. Marshall won the August 4 Republican primary and was elected on November 3, defeating Democratic nominee Barbara Bollier. Marshall was sworn in on January 3, 2021.

On January 6, 2021, Marshall joined a group of Republican senators led by Josh Hawley and Ted Cruz in support of the objections to Pennsylvania's and Arizona's electoral votes, both of which were overwhelmingly rejected by the Senate, 92-7 and 93-6 respectively.

Early life and education
Marshall was born in El Dorado, Kansas. He attended Butler Community College before attending Kansas State University, where he received a bachelor's degree in biochemistry and was a member of Beta Theta Pi. He received his Doctor of Medicine from the University of Kansas. He completed a residency in obstetrics and gynecology at Bayfront Medical Center in St. Petersburg, Florida.

Marshall has served as chairman of the board of Great Bend Regional Hospital and vice president of the Farmers Bank and Trust, and has been a district governor of Rotary International. He also served seven years in the United States Army Reserve, reaching the rank of captain.

U.S. House of Representatives

2016 campaign

Marshall ran against incumbent Tim Huelskamp in the Republican Party primary election for Kansas's 1st congressional district in the United States House of Representatives. He had the support of many of Kansas's agricultural groups, who were angry that Huelskamp lost his seat on the House Agriculture Committee, the first time in a century that no Kansan was on that panel. During the primary, Huelskamp's campaign ran TV ads criticizing Marshall for a confrontation with a neighbor in 2008 in connection with a land dispute; the neighbor made a 9-1-1 call accusing Marshall of attempting to run him over with a vehicle. Marshall ultimately pleaded no contest to a reckless driving misdemeanor and settled the neighbor's civil suit.

On August 2, Marshall defeated Huelskamp in the Republican primary, 56% to 44%. No Democrat filed to run in the heavily Republican district.

In the general election, Marshall won handily, defeating independent candidate Alan LaPolice and Libertarian Kerry Burt with 65.9% of the vote.

Marshall was endorsed by the United States Chamber of Commerce, the Kansas Livestock Association, the National Association of Wheat Growers, and the Kansas Farm Bureau, an affiliate of the American Farm Bureau Federation.

Marshall represented a district that had long been nicknamed "the Big First" because it covered all or part of 63 counties in central and western Kansas, more than half the state's land mass. It was the seventh-largest district in the nation that did not cover an entire state.

Tenure
Marshall was sworn into office on January 3, 2017.

On October 23, 2019, Marshall was part of a group of 15–30 House Republicans, led by Representative Matt Gaetz, who intruded upon that day's confidential hearing of the House Intelligence Committee. The Republican and Democratic committee members were meeting in a Sensitive Compartmented Information Facility (SCIF) to hear testimony from Deputy Assistant Secretary of Defense Laura Cooper in connection with the impeachment inquiry against Donald Trump. Marshall was one of a group of Republicans that followed Gaetz to the hearing room. Marshall called the impeachment inquiry a "sham" and contended that "the people of Kansas are sick and tired of these impeachment hearings."

Committee assignments

 Committee on Agriculture
 Subcommittee on Commodity Exchanges, Energy, and Credit
 Subcommittee on Nutrition
 Subcommittee on Livestock and Foreign Agriculture
 Committee on Science, Space, and Technology
 Subcommittee on Oversight 
 Subcommittee on Research and Technology
 Committee on Small Business
 Subcommittee on Health and Technology
 Subcommittee on Contracting and Workforce

U.S Senate
Marshall was sworn into office on January 3, 2021.

Elections

2020 

In September 2019, Marshall announced he would give up his House seat to run for the Senate seat being vacated by four-term incumbent Pat Roberts. In the Republican primary election, Marshall faced Kris Kobach, a polarizing ex-Kansas Secretary of State and Donald Trump ally known for his far-right views. Senate Republican leaders, fearing that Kobach's nomination would endanger their majority in the Senate, urged Trump to endorse Marshall; Trump did not. The U.S. Chamber of Commerce, the Kansas Farm Bureau and several anti-abortion organizations supported Marshall. The National Republican Senatorial Committee launched a major voter contact effort ("Operation Scorched Prairie") on Marshall's behalf making 2.3 million unique voter contacts via text and robocalls in the week before the election.

The rival campaigns and outside groups (super PACs) spent millions in attack ads; the primary was anticipated to be close, but Marshall ultimately won by 14.2 percentage points with 40.3% of the vote, although the second-place finisher (Kobach) and third-place finisher (Kansas City based plumber Bob Hamilton) combined for a higher total. Marshall won all but one county west of Emporia. In Sedgwick County, which contains Wichita, he beat Kobach 47% to 26%. He lost by a majority in Wyandotte County, which contains Kansas City, and by pluralities in most counties in eastern Kansas. In the general election, Marshall defeated Democratic State Senator Barbara Bollier 53% to 42%, the Libertarian Jason Buckley receiving 5%. In so doing, he continued a long line of former congressmen from the "Big First" subsequently representing Kansas in the Senate; due to its vast size, the district's congressman is usually reckoned as a statewide political figure. He succeeded Roberts, who represented the 1st from 1981 to 1997; Kansas's senior senator, Jerry Moran, represented the district from 1997 to 2011.

Committees
Committee on Energy and Natural Resources
Subcommittee on Energy
Subcommittee on Water and Power
Committee on Agriculture, Nutrition, and Forestry
Health, Education, Labor and Pensions Committee
Subcommittee on Children and Families
Subcommittee on Primary Health and Retirement Security
Senate Committee on Small Business and Entrepreneurship

Political positions
Marshall voted in line with Trump's position 98% of the time.

Abortion 
Marshall opposes abortion, including in cases of rape and incest. In 2020, he called for overturning Roe v. Wade, the Supreme Court decision that ruled abortion bans unconstitutional.

Attempt to overturn the 2020 election results 
In December 2020, Marshall was one of 126 House Republicans to sign an amicus brief in support of Texas v. Pennsylvania, a lawsuit filed at the United States Supreme Court contesting the results of the 2020 presidential election, in which Joe Biden defeated Trump. The Supreme Court declined to hear the case on the basis that Texas lacked standing under Article III of the Constitution to challenge the results of an election held by another state. House Speaker Nancy Pelosi issued a statement that called signing the amicus brief an act of "election subversion." She also reprimanded Marshall and the other House members who supported the lawsuit: "The 126 Republican Members that signed onto this lawsuit brought dishonor to the House. Instead of upholding their oath to support and defend the Constitution, they chose to subvert the Constitution and undermine public trust in our sacred democratic institutions."

Marshall disputed the results of the 2020 presidential election, claiming that in "several states" "governors, secretaries of states and activist courts" usurped legislatures to create voting rules. Therefore, he announced that he would oppose the January 6, 2021, certification of the Electoral College count. He would also call for an electoral commission to investigate "the integrity of the ballot, to hold states accountable to the time proven constitutional system of the Electoral College."

Marshall was participating in the certification of the Electoral College count when Trump supporters stormed the United States Capitol. He blamed "the rioters, vandals, and trespassers" for destroying "any chance we had for peaceful discussion and debate on restoring and ensuring confidence in this and all future elections." He also called for participants to be "prosecuted to the fullest extent."

After the Capitol was secure, Marshall joined the Senate to continue the vote on the certification. Marshall supported the objections to Arizona's and Pennsylvania's electoral votes. The Senate rejected these objections by 93-6 and 92-7 respectively. He called his decision to object to the count "from my heart." Following the vote on certification, Marshall acknowledged that Joe Biden would be president and urged a peaceful transition of power.

As a result of his refusal to certify the count, the Kansas Democratic Party called for his expulsion from Congress for failure to "execute [his] oath of office to support and defend the United States Constitution". The McPherson Sentinel editorial board wrote that Marshall "should be ashamed" of his decision to support false claims of voter fraud and trying to overturn the election.

On May 28, 2021, Marshall voted against creating an independent commission to investigate the 2021 United States Capitol attack.

Cannabis 
Of medical marijuana, Marshall said in 2017, "I'm not convinced that it's medically proven and a good idea... I think there's a path there, but I just haven't seen enough scientific data to say it's a good thing."

COVID-19 pandemic 
During the COVID-19 pandemic, Marshall has promoted conspiracy theories that falsely suggest that the Centers for Disease Control and Prevention were inflating coronavirus death numbers. Facebook removed Marshall's posts from its platform as a violation of its rule against "harmful misinformation". Marshall called Facebook's removal of his misinformation "corporate censorship".

Marshall does not dispute the effectiveness of masks in halting the spread of the coronavirus but he opposes face mask mandates. He has appeared at indoor campaign events without a face mask before maskless crowds who did not observe social distancing.

During the pandemic, Marshall promoted prophylactic use of hydroxychloroquine, an antimalarial drug Trump promoted, despite its being unproven as an effective treatment and despite government warnings about using it outside research or hospital settings. He said he himself used the drug to proactively guard against the virus.

Environment 
Marshall rejects the scientific consensus on climate change, saying, "I'm not sure that there is even climate change." He has criticized the Environmental Protection Agency and supports reducing its authority. Marshall supports the federal renewable fuel standard, which requires corn-based ethanol to be blended with gasoline. He supported Trump's decision to withdraw the U.S. from the Paris climate accord.

Hate crimes
Marshall was one of six Republican senators to vote against expanding the COVID-19 Hate Crimes Act, which would allow the U.S. Justice Department to review hate crimes related to COVID-19 and establish an online database.

Health care
Marshall supports repealing the Patient Protection and Affordable Care Act (Obamacare). He voted for the American Health Care Act of 2017, which would have repealed and replaced the ACA. In 2020, he continued to campaign on repealing and replacing the ACA.

Marshall opposes Medicaid expansion in Kansas. He says he "measures success in how many people can afford to leave the Medicaid program and enter the private insurance market." In explaining his opposition to Medicaid expansion, Marshall said in an interview in March 2017 that some people "just don't want health care." His remarks attracted criticism; Marshall said they were taken out of context and cited his work as a doctor at a free family planning clinic which he said was the only clinic in the area to accept Medicaid.

Economy 
Marshall, who represents a rural state, supports farm subsidies, such as federal crop insurance. His support for subsidies gained him the 2016 endorsement of the Kansas Farm Bureau in the Republican primary.

In December 2017, Marshall voted for the Tax Cuts and Jobs Act of 2017.

Foreign policy 
While serving in the House, Marshall was among 60 Republicans to vote against condemning Trump's decision to withdraw troops from Syria.

Immigration 
Marshall supported Trump's Executive Order 13769, which barred citizens of seven Muslim-majority nations from entering the United States. He supports an immigration bill with a pathway to citizenship for people not living in the U.S. legally.

Personal life
Marshall lives in Great Bend, Kansas, where he practiced medicine. He and his wife, Laina, have four children.

On January 31, 2018, Marshall was a passenger on a chartered Amtrak train involved in the 2018 Crozet, Virginia train crash. He administered first aid and CPR to the injured.

Marshall is a non-denominational Protestant.

Electoral history
Kansas's 1st congressional district, 2016

See also
Physicians in the United States Congress

References

External links

 Roger Marshall for Senate official campaign website
 
 Senator Roger Marshall official senate website
 
 

|-

|-

|-

|-

1960 births
21st-century American politicians
American obstetricians
American Protestants
Kansas State University alumni
Living people
People from El Dorado, Kansas
People from Great Bend, Kansas
Physicians from Kansas
Protestants from Kansas
Republican Party members of the United States House of Representatives from Kansas
Republican Party United States senators from Kansas
United States Army reservists
University of Kansas School of Medicine alumni
United States Army officers